Jihad Mughniyah (2 May 1991 – 18 January 2015) was a prominent member of the Lebanese Shia militant group Hezbollah and the son of Imad Mugniyah. He was killed in 2015 in the Mazraat Amal incident, an airstrike attributed to Israel.

Biography 
Jihad Mughniyah was the son of Hezbollah commander Imad Mugniyah, a Lebanese Islamist who fought against Israel and the United States in the Middle East in a series of Guerrilla warfare. He was of Lebanese Shia Muslim descent. Jihad was born in Tayr Dibba, near Tyre. He was the third child of Imad Mughniyah from his first marriage to Saedi Badreddine. Jihad had 5 more half-siblings from his father's other marriages; Israa, Hasan, Hussein, Foad, Zahraa. Jihad was studying business at LAU, but dropped out the last semester before graduation to continue working for Hezbollah. 

In 1991 his family, without Imad Mughniyah, went to Iran for security reasons. Later they came back to Lebanon and began their life in South Lebanon. Jihad Mughniyah became well known in Iran by sharing his pictures of him standing behind Qasem Soleimani in Soleimani's mother's funeral. In 2008, his father was killed in a car bombing in Damascus in what has been described as a joint Mossad-CIA operation. Mughniyah proclaimed his allegiance to Hezbollah's secretary-general Hassan Nasrallah a week after the assassination of his father, blaming Israel for the killing. Some sources says he was one of Hassan Nasrallah's bodyguards. Mughniyah was targeted in the bid to stop Hezbollah establishing a missile base in the Quneitra region on the border of Syria's Golan Heights.

Death
On 18 January 2015, days after Nasrallah declared that Israel's airstrikes in Syria meant that the Syrian Arab Republic and its allies had the right to respond, an Israeli helicopter attacked Mughniyah's positions in the Quneitra Governorate of Syria, killing him and five other Hezbollah commanders, including Mohamad Issa, when they were reportedly driving in a convoy alongside Iranian Revolutionary Guard Corps (IRGC) troops near the Israeli-occupied Golan Heights. Hezbollah retaliated on January 28 by firing anti-tank missiles at an IDF convoy on the Shebaa Farms, killing two IDF soldiers.

See also
 Mustafa Badreddine

References

1991 births
2015 deaths
Hezbollah members
Hezbollah bombers
Lebanese Islamists
Hezbollah hijackers
People from South Lebanon
Lebanese people murdered abroad
Assassinated Lebanese people
Assassinations in Syria
People murdered in Syria
Targeted killing
Assassinated Hezbollah members